Arstanda "Ladd" White (August 7, 1917 – April 1, 1963) was an American Negro league pitcher in the 1940s.

A native of Redland, Oklahoma, White made his Negro leagues debut in 1946 with the Memphis Red Sox. He played with Memphis again the following season, then played for the Indianapolis Clowns in 1948. White went on to play minor league baseball through 1950 with the Leavenworth Braves and Drummondville Cubs. He died in Contra Costa, California in 1963 at age 45.

References

External links
 and Seamheads

1917 births
1963 deaths
Indianapolis Clowns players
Memphis Red Sox players
Baseball pitchers
Baseball players from Oklahoma
People from Sequoyah County, Oklahoma
Leavenworth Braves players
Drummondville Cubs players
20th-century African-American sportspeople